Tyler Johnson is an American record producer and songwriter based in Nashville and Los Angeles. He won one Grammy Award out of five nominations.

Career
Johnson started out as an assistant to producer Jeff Bhasker. He was nominated for a Grammy Award for his work as an engineer on Taylor Swift's 2012 album Red, and was nominated for a second Grammy for his work as a producer and engineer on Ed Sheeran's 2014 album x. Johnson produced the 2015 album Untamed by country artist Cam, co-writing eight tracks including the singles "Burning House", "Mayday", and "My Mistake". He also produced 10 songs on Cam's 2020 album The Otherside, co-writing 6 of them. He co-wrote and produced Harry Styles' 2017 debut self-titled solo album, and also co-wrote and produced all but two tracks on Styles' 2019 follow-up Fine Line, including "Watermelon Sugar", which went to number 1 on the Billboard Hot 100. As a writer, producer, and engineer, Johnson has also worked with artists including Keith Urban, Miley Cyrus, John Legend, Diplo, Pink, OneRepublic, Sam Smith, Meghan Trainor, and Toni Braxton.

On January 19, 2018, Johnson released his debut single as a solo artist, "Give Up On Me".

Discography

Singles
 "Give Up On Me" (2018)
 "You and I" (2018)

Songwriting and production

– Source:

Awards and nominations
{| class="wikitable"
|-
!Year
!Organization
!Award
!Project
!Result
|-
|2014
|56th Grammy Awards
|rowspan=2|Album of the Year
|Taylor Swift, Red
|
|-
|2015
|57th Grammy Awards
|Ed Sheeran, x
|
|-
|-
|rowspan="2"|2016
|rowspan="2"|CMA Awards
|Song of the Year
|Cam, "Burning House"
|
|-
|Album of the Year
| Keith Urban, Ripcord
|
|-
|-
|rowspan="2"|2016
|rowspan="2"|ACM Awards
|Song of the Year
| Cam, "Burning House"
|
|-
|Single Record of the Year
| Cam, "Burning House"
|
|-
|2016
|NSAI Awards
|Songs I Wish I'd Written
| Cam, "Burning House"
|
|-
|2017
|ACM Awards
|Album of the Year
|Keith Urban, Ripcord
|
|-
|rowspan=3|2023
|rowspan=3|65th Grammy Awards
|Record of the Year
|Harry Styles, As It Was
|
|-
|Album of the Year
|Harry Styles, Harry's House
|
|-
|Song of the Year
|Harry Styles, As It Was
|
|-

References

Year of birth missing (living people)
Living people
Record producers from Colorado
Songwriters from Colorado
People from Steamboat Springs, Colorado